Stephen Dean Jacobson (born November 18, 1962) is a former American football guard who played for the Miami Dolphins in 1987. He played college football at Abilene Christian University.

References

1962 births
Living people
American football offensive guards
Texas A&M Aggies football players
Abilene Christian Wildcats football players
Miami Dolphins players